Gyros—in some regions, chiefly North America, anglicized as a gyro—is meat cooked on a vertical rotisserie (similar to Doner kebab), then sliced and served wrapped or stuffed in pita bread, along with other ingredients such as tomato, onion, fried potatoes, and tzatziki. In Greece, it is normally made with pork or sometimes with chicken, whilst beef and lamb are also used in other countries.

History

Grilling a vertical spit of stacked meat and slicing it off as it cooks was developed in Bursa in the 19th century in the Ottoman Empire, and called doner kebab. Following World War II, doner kebab made with lamb was present in Athens, introduced by immigrants from Anatolia and the Middle East, possibly with the population exchange between Greece and Turkey. The Greek version is normally made with pork and served with tzatziki, and became known as gyros.

By 1970, gyros wraps were already a popular fast food in Athens, as well as in Chicago and New York City. At that time, although vertical rotisseries were starting to be mass-produced in the US by Gyros Inc. of Chicago, the stacks of meat were still hand-made. There are several claimants to have introduced the first mass-produced gyros to the United States, all based in the Chicago area in the early 1970s, and of Greek descent. One of them, Peter Parthenis, states that the mass-produced gyro was first conceptualized by John and Margaret Garlic; John Garlic was a Jewish car salesman who later ran a restaurant featuring live dolphins.

Name
It was originally called  in Greece. The word  was criticized in mid-1970s Greece for being Turkish. Some Greek restaurants in the US, such as the Syntagma Square in New York City—which can be seen briefly in the 1976 film Taxi Driver—continued to use both doner kebab and gyros to refer to the same dish, in the 1970s.

In Athens and other parts of southern Greece, the skewered meat dish elsewhere called souvlaki, is known as kalamaki, while souvlaki is a term used generally for gyros, and similar dishes. 

In Greek, "gyros" is a nominative singular noun, but the final 's' is often interpreted as an English plural, leading to the singular back-formation "gyro".

Preparation
In Greece, gyros is normally made with pork, though other meats are used in other countries. Chicken is common, and lamb or beef may be found more rarely. Typical American mass-produced gyros are made with finely ground beef mixed with lamb.

For hand-made gyros, meat is cut into approximately round, thin, flat slices, which are then stacked on a spit and seasoned. Fat trimmings are usually interspersed. Spices may include cumin, oregano, thyme, rosemary, and others. The pieces of meat, in the shape of an inverted cone, are placed on a tall vertical rotisserie, which turns slowly in front of a source of heat or broiler. As the cone cooks, lower parts are basted with the juices running off the upper parts. The outside of the meat is sliced vertically in thin, crisp shavings when done.

The rate of roasting can be adjusted by varying the intensity of the heat, the distance between the heat and the meat, and the speed of spit rotation, thus allowing the cook to adjust for varying rates of consumption.

In Greece, it is customarily served in an oiled, lightly grilled piece of pita, rolled up with sliced tomatoes, chopped onions, lettuce, and fried potatoes, sometimes topped with tzatziki, or, sometimes in northern Greece, ketchup or mustard.

See also

 List of Greek dishes
 List of kebabs
 List of spit-roasted foods

References

External links 

 

Arab cuisine
Fast food
Flatbread dishes
Greek cuisine
Greek words and phrases
Levantine cuisine
Meat dishes
Mediterranean cuisine
Middle Eastern grilled meats
National dishes
Sandwiches
Spit-cooked foods